The Irving Convention and Visitors Bureau (also known as the ICVB) is an independent nonprofit organization which aims to direct individuals traveling to Dallas and Fort Worth for business conventions and for leisure. It is a hospitality industry, which makes $1.5 billion annually. ICVB is funded by Irving's hotel and motel tax collections which includes hundreds of restaurants and 75 hotels which have more than 11,000 rooms. The Irving CVB is not a membership-based organization.

History
Irving was founded in 1903 by J.O. Schulze and Otis Brown, after purchasing  of land which is now Irving. The first two town lots sold in December 1903 at the public auction.

Location
The Irving CVB building is located immediately adjacent to Dallas/Fort Worth International Airport alongside Las Colinas. It is located in between Dallas and Fort Worth.

Awards
ICVB received the Gold Service Award from Meetings and Conventions Magazine, the Awards of Excellence from Corporate & Incentive Travel Magazine, and the Successful Meetings' Pinnacle Award.

References
About the Irving CVB
About Irving

External links
Irving CVB Official Website
Irving Chamber of Commerce
Mustangs of Las Colinas
Tourism agencies
Tourism in Texas
1903 establishments in Texas

Non-profit organizations based in Irving, Texas